Gažon is a village in the City Municipality of Koper in the Littoral region of Slovenia.

The local church is dedicated to the Feast of Saints Peter and Paul and belongs to the Parish of Šmarje.

References

External links
Gažon on Geopedia

Populated places in the City Municipality of Koper